Walton High School formerly Nelson Grammar School (prior to 1972) was located on Oxford Road, Nelson in Lancashire, England. The school existed between 1972 and 2006.

The school became Pendle Vale College in September 2006, and construction of the new building commenced July 2006. Construction was finished in time for the new term on 7 September 2008.

History
The building had four different school names over its c.80 years. First, when the new building opened on Monday 14 October 1929, the school was known as Nelson Municipal Secondary School. In 1945, the named changed to Nelson Grammar School, then to Walton High School in 1972. Finally, in its last year as a building, the name changed to Pendle Vale College.

Destruction
The Walton High School Complex had four buildings surrounded by a field and an all weather playing pitch. The school's main building hosted academic classes. The art and food building formerly stood to the left of the main building. Behind the main building were the science and French rooms.

Demolition of the Walton High complex began in December 2008, and was completed in January 2009.

Alumni

Walton High School
 Khalil Ahmed, Headteacher, Fellow Royal Asiatic Society
 Jody Latham, actor in Shameless
 Nicola Wheeler, actress in Emmerdale
 Phil Woolas, Labour MP (Nelson Grammar 1970–1972, Walton High 1972–75)

Nelson Grammar School
 Prof Susan Birley, Professor of Entrepreneurship at Imperial College London from 1990–2003
 Christine Butler, Labour MP for Castle Point from 1997–2002
 Prof Brian Duerden, Professor of Medical Microbiology at Cardiff University since 1991
 Dr Derek Leaver FRSE (1929–1990) chemist
 Prof John Morton (neuroscientist) OBE, FRS, cognitive scientist
 Prof Barry T Pickup, Professor of Theoretical Chemistry at Sheffield University
 Sir John Oldham (health specialist), received an OBE for services to patients (2001) and awarded a knighthood for services to the NHS (2003)

Nelson Municipal Secondary School
 Sir Frank Hartley (pharmacist), Vice Chancellor, University of London, 1976 to 1978; attended from c.1920 to 1926

References

External links
 Picture pre-demolition
 Unofficial Website showing Photograph of All Walton High School Staff and Pupils - taken in 1982
 Location of Walton High School (Map)
 Final Working Version of the Official Website of the Former Walton High School (this website was Discontinued September 2009)
 Pendle Vale College Official Website

Defunct schools in Lancashire
Schools in the Borough of Pendle
Educational institutions established in 1929
Educational institutions disestablished in 2007
1929 establishments in England
2007 disestablishments in England
Nelson, Lancashire